Systematic theology, or systematics, is a discipline of Christian theology that formulates an orderly, rational, and coherent account of the doctrines of the Christian faith. It addresses issues such as what the Bible teaches about certain topics or what is true about God and His universe.  It also builds on biblical disciplines, church history, as well as biblical and historical theology. Systematic theology shares its systematic tasks with other disciplines such as constructive theology, dogmatics, ethics, apologetics, and philosophy of religion.

Method 
With a methodological tradition that differs somewhat from biblical theology, systematic theology draws on the core sacred texts of Christianity, while simultaneously investigating the development of Christian doctrine over the course of history, particularly through philosophy, ethics, social sciences, and natural sciences. Using biblical texts, it attempts to compare and relate all of scripture which led to the creation of a systematized statement on what the whole Bible says about particular issues.

Within Christianity, different traditions (both intellectual and ecclesial) approach systematic theology in different ways impacting a) the method employed to develop the system, b) the understanding of theology's task, c) the doctrines included in the system, and d) the order those doctrines appear. Even with such diversity, it is generally the case that works that one can describe as systematic theologies begin with revelation and conclude with eschatology.

Since it is focused on truth, systematic theology is also framed to interact with and address the contemporary world. There are numerous authors who explored this area such as the case of Charles Gore, John Walvoord, Lindsay Dewar, and Charles Moule, among others. The framework developed by these theologians involved a review of postbiblical history of a doctrine after first treating the biblical materials. This process concludes with applications to contemporary issues.

Categories
Since it is a systemic approach, systematic theology organizes truth under different headings and there are ten basic areas (or categories), although the exact list may vary slightly. These are:

Angelology – The study of angels
Bibliology – The study of the Bible
Christology – The study of Christ
Demonology – The study of demons
Ecclesiology – The study of the church
Eschatology – The study of the end times
Hamartiology – The study of sin
Mariology – the study of all things pertaining to Mary, the mother of Jesus
Missiology – The study of missionary work
Paterology — The study of God the Father
Pneumatology – The study of the Holy Spirit
Soteriology – The study of salvation
Teleology – The study of God’s design and purpose for the world and all He created in it
Theological anthropology – The study of the nature of humanity
Theology proper – The study of the character of God

History

The establishment and integration of varied Christian ideas and Christianity-related notions, including diverse topics and themes of the Bible, in a single, coherent and well-ordered presentation is a relatively late development. In Eastern Orthodoxy, an early example is provided by John of Damascus's 8th-century Exposition of the Orthodox Faith, in which he attempts to set in order and demonstrate the coherence of the theology of the classic texts of the Eastern theological tradition.

In the West, Peter Lombard's 12th-century Sentences, wherein he thematically collected a great series of quotations of the Church Fathers, became the basis of a medieval scholastic tradition of thematic commentary and explanation. Thomas Aquinas's Summa Theologiae best exemplifies this scholastic tradition. The Lutheran scholastic tradition of a thematic, ordered exposition of Christian theology emerged in the 16th century with Philipp Melanchthon's Loci Communes, and was countered by a Calvinist scholasticism, which is exemplified by John Calvin's Institutes of the Christian Religion.

In the 19th century, primarily in Protestant groups, a new kind of systematic theology arose that attempted to demonstrate that Christian doctrine formed a more coherent system premised on one or more fundamental axioms.  Such theologies often involved a more drastic pruning and reinterpretation of traditional belief in order to cohere with the axiom or axioms. Friedrich Daniel Ernst Schleiermacher, for example, produced Der christliche Glaube nach den Grundsätzen der evangelischen Kirche (The Christian Faith According to the Principles of the Protestant Church) in the 1820s, in which the fundamental idea is the universal presence among humanity, sometimes more hidden, sometimes more explicit, of a feeling or awareness of 'absolute dependence'.

See also

Biblical exegesis
Biblical theology
:Category:Systematic theologians
Christian apologetics
Christian theology
Constructive theology
Dispensationalist theology
Dogmatic Theology
Feminist theology
Hermeneutics
Historicism (Christianity)
Liberal Christianity
Liberation theology
Philosophical theology
Philosophy of religion
Political theology
Postliberal theology
Process theology
Theology of Anabaptism

References

Resources 

 Barth, Karl (1956–1975).  Church Dogmatics. (thirteen volumes) Edinburgh: T&T Clark.
 Berkhof, Hendrikus (1979). Christian Faith: An Introduction to the Study of the Faith. Grand Rapids: Eerdmans.
 Berkhof, Louis (1996). Systematic Theology. Grand Rapids: Wm. B. Eerdmans Publishing Co.
 Bloesch, Donald G. (2002–2004). Christian Foundations  (seven volumes). Inter-varsity Press.
 Calvin, John (1559). Institutes of the Christian Religion.
 Chafer, Lewis Sperry (1948). Systematic Theology. Grand Rapids: Kregel
 Chemnitz, Martin (1591).  Loci Theologici.  St. Louis: Concordia Publishing House, 1989.
 Erickson, Millard (1998). Christian Theology (2nd ed.). Grand Rapids: Baker, 1998.
 Frame, John. Theology of Lordship
 Fruchtenbaum, Arnold (1989). Israelology: The Missing Link in Systematic Theology. Tustin, CA: Ariel Ministries
 Fruchtenbaum, Arnold (1998). Messianic Christology. Tustin, CA: Ariel Ministries
 Geisler, Norman L. (2002–2004). Systematic Theology (four volumes). Minneapolis: Bethany House.
 Grenz, Stanley J. (1994). Theology for the Community of God. Grand Rapids: Eerdmans.
 Grider, J. Kenneth (1994).  A Wesleyan-Holiness Theology
 Grudem, Wayne (1995). Systematic Theology. Zondervan.
 Hodge, Charles (1960). Systematic Theology. Grand Rapids: Wm. B. Eerdmans Publishing Co.
 Jenson, Robert W. (1997–1999).  Systematic Theology.  Oxford: Oxford University Press.
 Melanchthon, Philipp (1543).  Loci Communes.  St. Louis: Concordia Publishing House, 1992.
 Miley, John. Systematic Theology. 1892.
 Newlands, George (1994). God in Christian Perspective. Edinburgh: T&T Clark.
 Oden, Thomas C. (1987–1992).  Systematic Theology (3 volumes).  Peabody, MA: Prince Press.
 Pannenberg, Wolfhart (1988–1993).  Systematic Theology.  Grand Rapids: Wm. B. Eerdmans Publishing Co.
 Pieper, Francis (1917–1924).  Christian Dogmatics.  St. Louis: Concordia Publishing House.
 Reymond, Robert L. (1998). A New Systematic Theology of the Christian Faith (2nd ed.). Word Publishing.
 Schleiermacher, Friedrich (1928).  The Christian Faith.  Edinburgh: T&T Clark.
 St. Augustine of Hippo (354–430). De Civitate Dei
 Thielicke, Helmut (1974–1982). The Evangelical Faith. Edinburgh: T&T Clark.
 Thiessen, Henry C. (1949). Systematic Theology. Grand Rapids: William B. Erdsmans Publishing Co.
 Tillich, Paul. Systematic Theology. (3 volumes).
 Turretin, Francis (3 parts, 1679–1685). Institutes of Elenctic Theology.
 Van Til, Cornelius (1974). An Introduction to Systematic Theology. P & R Press.
 Watson, Richard. Theological Institutes. 1823.
 Weber, Otto. (1981–1983) Foundations of Dogmatics. Grand Rapids: Eerdmans.

 
Christian theology
Christian terminology